The Lodha Committee was appointed by the Supreme Court of India on 23 January 2015 to analyse and recommend implementable actions for improving the Board of Control for Cricket in India (BCCI), assess the quantum of punishment for Gurunath Meiyappan and Raj Kundra in the Indian Premier League (IPL) betting scandal, and analyse the role of Sundar Raman. The Lodha Committee report was submitted on 14 July 2015.

History 
The establishment of the Lodha Committee was the result of the report submitted by the Justice Mukul Mudgal Committee after an investigation into the 2013 IPL betting scandal. The purpose of the Lodha Committee was to analyse and recommend implementable actions for improving the Board of Control for Cricket in India (BCCI), assess the quantum of punishment for Gurunath Meiyappan and Raj Kundra in the Indian Premier League (IPL) betting scandal, and analyse the role of Sundar Raman. The report suggested various changes within the BCCI such as the appointment conditions of the CFO and CEO, age of office bearers, advertisements during the IPL matches, and appointment of the Comptroller and Auditor General (CAG) official. The Lodha Committee report was submitted on 14 July 2015.

In brief, the Lodha Committee offered the following recommendations:

 The retirement age to be fixed at 70 years. Any administrator who (a) has criminal charge/s, (b) is of unsound mind, (c) is insolvent, and (d) holds a position in any other athletic association needs to be removed. The tenure of any officer bearer to be fixed for two consecutive terms.
 A "one vote per state" policy to make BCCI more transparent in its dealings.
 BCCI President cannot have a tenure of more than two years.
 An independent and sovereign governing body for the IPL.
 To ensure that BCCI officials are not involved in any betting, they need to disclose their assets to the governing board.

The recommendations of the Lodha Committee shook the BCCI hierarchy and its related associations. The BCCI raised objections to the recommendations and approached the Supreme Court. The final judgment by the Supreme Court was delivered on 18 July 2016, by a two-judge bench consisting of Justice Ibrahim Kalifulla and TS Thakur, the Chief Justice of India. The final judgment upheld the Lodha Committee recommendations, paving the way for a major change within the BCCI.

References 

Cricket controversies
Indian Premier League